Irmgard (minor planet designation: 591 Irmgard) is a minor planet orbiting the Sun.

References

External links
 
 

Background asteroids
Irmgard
Irmgard
X-type asteroids (Tholen)
19060314